Brione may refer to the following places:

in Italy
Brione, Lombardy, a comune in the Province of Brescia
Brione, Trentino, a comune in the Province of Trento

in Switzerland
Brione, Switzerland a comune in the Canton of Ticino
Brione sopra Minusio, a comune in the Canton of Ticino

See also
 Brion (disambiguation)